, also known as , is the largest of the brothel districts in Osaka, and also the largest in western Japan. It is located in the Sanno 3-chōme area of Nishinari-ku, Osaka. Tobita Shinchi dates from the Taishō period. To circumvent the anti-prostitution laws, the brothels operate largely under the guise of being "Japanese-style restaurants" (Ryoutei).

Overview
The area consists of three main streets: Youth Street (青春通り Seishun Doori), Main Street (メイン通り Mein Doori) and Big Gate Street (大門通り Ohmon Doori).

Tobita brothels, similar to how brothels in Amsterdam have women in the windows, tend to have a young woman kneeling by the genkan (entryway) or in the living room (which is fully open to the street) of the brothel to attract customers—an unusual practice for brothels in Japan. Often the women are dressed in schoolgirl or nurse costumes. Most of the prostitutes are Japanese, although there are some zainichi (Koreans).

An elderly woman called the 'Yarite Babaa’ or 'Mama-san', often the owner of the residence, sits in the genkan and greets male passers-by with phrases like . Many of the brothels will only accept Japanese or Asian clients. The area is popular with visitors from China, Taiwan and Korea.

The nearest metro and mainline stations are Dōbutsuen-mae Station.

One of the oldest buildings in the area, the Taiyoshi Hyaku, was given 'cultural property' status in 2000. It was originally built as a 21-room brothel in 1918 and was converted to a restaurant in 1970. The themed rooms of the brothel have been retained.

History
On 16 January 1912, the red-light district of Shinchi Otobe in the Namba district of Osaka, containing 2,000 prostitutes and 100 brothels, burnt down. The brothels were moved to the current Tobita Shinchi location after a cemetery was cleared from the grounds. The area is on the south side of the then newly built Shinsekai entertainment area, which was thought to be advantageous. However, there were many protests from anti-prostitution campaigners to the setting up of the new brothel district. Tobita Shinchi was one of the last licensed Yūkaku areas to be created.

The area escaped the bombing of Osaka during WW2, and continued to thrive until the Prostitution Prevention Law came into effect on 1 April 1958. However the area only closed for one night, the brothels re-opening as "restaurants" the next day.

Tobita Restaurant Association
To circumvent the anti-prostitution laws, the brothels operate as restaurants. Tea and snacks are served to the client in a private room. Subsequent sexual contact between the "waitress" and the client is viewed as a "private affair" between them under Osaka's liberal interpretation of the law.

The brothels organised themselves into a trade association, the Tobita Restaurant Association (Tobita Ryouri Kumiai), although some genuine restaurants in the area are members. Osaka mayor Tōru Hashimoto was a legal adviser of the Association.

It was reported that all restaurants (159 shops) joining the Tobita Restaurant Association will be closed on June 28 and 29, when the 2019 G20 Osaka summit will be held in Osaka on May 16, 2019.

See also
 Prostitution in Japan

References

External links

 I went to Tobita Shinchi - Gigazine (Japanese, with many pictures), May 21, 2012
 Japanese hidden prostitution district: red light district in Tobita-Shinchi Osaka video on YouTube
 Brief history and guide video on YouTube

Sexuality in Japan
Tourist attractions in Osaka
Red-light districts in Japan
Prostitution in Japan
Geography of Osaka
Zainichi Korean culture